The Environment Agency – Abu Dhabi (EAD) is a governmental agency established in 1996 in Abu Dhabi, United Arab Emirates (UAE) tasked with environmental protection matters in the Emirate of Abu Dhabi.

History 

In 1989, the National Avian Research Centre (NARC) was established as a conservation, research and captive breeding organisation in Abu Dhabi.  In 1996, it was renamed the Environmental Research and Wildlife Development Agency (ERWDA). In 2005, ERWDA became known as the Environment Agency – Abu Dhabi (EAD) and was chaired by the Crown Prince of the Emirate of Abu Dhabi, Sheikh Mohamed bin Zayed Al Nahyan.

The Environment Agency – Abu Dhabi (EAD) is chaired by Hamdan Bin Zayed Al Nahyan. The Vice Chairman is Mohamed Ahmed Al Bowardi. Razan Khalifa Al Mubarak, is the Managing Director and Board Member. The Secretary General is Dr. Shaikha Salem Al Dhaheri and the Deputy Secretary General is Dr. Jaber Eidha Al Jaberi. EAD has its main headquarters in the city of Abu Dhabi, with an office in Al Ain city.

In 2000, the Scimitar-horned oryx was officially declared extinct in the wild by the IUCN Red List. Beginning in 2016, efforts by the EAD together with the Sahara Conservation Fund, Zoological Society of London, Smithsonian Conservation Biology Institute, and the Government of Chad have successfully released 200 oryx that were bred in Abu Dhabi into the wild in Chad. In 2017, the reintroduction effort reported a number of successes including the first calves born in the wild in decades. The EAD has also undertaken a successful captive breeding programme and reintroduction efforts to reintroduce the Arabian oryx back into the wild. The Arabian oryx has moved from "Endangered" to the less-serious category of "Vulnerable" in the latest Red List of Threatened Species by the International Union for Conservation of Nature (IUCN). and in the Western Region of Abu Dhabi Emirate.

Films 
The agency has produced documentary films including:

 Back to the Wild (2018) tells the story of the reintroduction of the previously extinct in the wild Scimitar Horned Oryx back into the wild in Chad.
 Zayed's Antarctic Lights (2018) tells the story of three ambassadors who visited Antarctica in the Year of Zayed and sent a message to the world on climate change and plastics in solar lights. This film won a Bronze World Medal at the New York Festivals TV & Film Awards.  
 Our Sea. Our Heritage (2019) tells the story of the traditional knowledge of the UAE fishery and the fishery's proposed recovery plan. 
 Our Sea. Our Future (2021) tells the story of the fisheries recovery in the UAE as a result of the regulations which were introduced.
 Wild Abu Dhabi: The Turtles of Al Dhafra (2021) follows three agency scientists in their turtle conservation work in the warmest sea in the world, the Persian Gulf. This film won a finalist award in the 2021 New York Festivals TV & Film Awards.

References

  http://extwprlegs1.fao.org/docs/pdf/uae67960E.pdf
  https://www.ecolex.org/details/legislation/law-no16-of-2005-pertaining-to-the-reorganization-of-the-abu-dhabi-environment-agency-lex-faoc067923/
  https://www.ead.gov.ae/en/about-us/our-leadership
  https://www.zsl.org/conservation/regions/africa/reintroducing-scimitar-horned-oryx-to-chad
  https://www.ead.gov.ae/en/discover-our-biodiversity/sheikh-zayed-protected-areas-network
  https://www.ead.gov.ae/en/about-us/what-we-do/conserve
  https://gulfnews.com/uae/environment/ead-launches-sustainable-campus-initiative-1.1342564
  https://www.wam.ae/en/details/1395302829727
  https://www.moccae.gov.ae/en/knowledge-and-statistics/marine-environment-and-fisheries-sustainability.aspx
  https://gulfnews.com/uae/environment/abu-dhabi-completes-worlds-largest-desalinated-water-reserve-1.2157536
  https://www.thenational.ae/business/economy/abu-dhabi-unveils-a-dh1-6bn-underground-reserve-for-desalinated-water-1.695643

Government agencies of Abu Dhabi